Islam is the second largest religion in Malawi behind Christianity. Nearly all of Malawi's Muslims adhere to Sunni Islam. Though difficult to assess, according to the CIA Factbook, in 2018 about 13.8% of the country's population was Muslim. Muslim organisations in the country claim a figure of 20-25%. According to the latest census (2018), Muslims make up 13.8% (2,426,754) of the country's population. According to the Malawi Religion Project run by the University of Pennsylvania, in 2010 approximately 25.6% of the population was Muslim, concentrated mostly in the Southern Region.

History
Islam arrived in Malawi with the Arab and Swahili traders who traded in ivory, gold and later on slaves beginning from 15th century. It is also argued that Islam first arrived in Malawi through traders from the Kilwa Sultanate. Two Muslim teachers, Shayhks Abdallah Mkwanda and Sabiti Ngaunje, also played an important role in the spread of Islam. According to UNESCO, the first mosque was built by Swahili-Arab ivory traders.

During the colonial era, the authorities in the country feared that Islam posed the greatest threat, as an ideology of resistance, to their rule. This view was shared by Christian missionaries, who greatly feared that Islam could unite Africans in hostilities and uprisings against colonial rule.

The Yao converted to Islam in the 19th century, comprising the largest Muslim group in Malawi since. Some Chewa also converted to Islam during the same period.

The 1970s witnessed the start of an Islamic revival among Muslims in Malawi, as well as among Muslims across the globe. Recently, Muslim groups have engaged in missionary work in Malawi. Much of this is performed by the African Muslim Agency, based in Kuwait. The Kuwait-sponsored AMA has translated the Qur'an into Chichewa (Cinyanja), one of the official languages of Malawi, and has engaged in other missionary work in the country. There are thought to be about 800 jumu'ah mosques in the country, with at least one or two to be found in nearly every town. There are also several Islamic schools and a broadcasting station called Radio Islam. A major Muslim center of learning exists in Mpemba, outside of Blantyre, funded mainly by money from Saudi Arabia and Kuwait.

Demography
A large number of Muslims in Malawi come from the Yao people, who are described as "the most important source of Islam in the country". Even before their conversion to Islam, many Yao chiefs used Swahili Muslims as scribes and advisers. As a result of their strong trading contacts with Swahili-Arabs, many Yao adopted Islam and the two groups had cases of intermarriages in the past. The Yao form the largest majority south and east of Lake Malawi. Muslims can also be found among other groups, such as the lakeside Chewa people and Indian and other Asian Malawians.  Muslims in the country have been described as a "vocal and powerful community."

In general, most Malawian Muslims are Sunni. Most Muslims of African descent in Malawi are Sunni and belong to the Shafi'i madhhab. Meanwhile, Muslims of Asian descent in Malawi are also mostly Sunni and belong to the Hanafi madhhab. Additionally, there is a small number of Shiites among people of Lebanese origin in Malawi. 

According to the 2018 census, over half of Malawian Muslims live in Mangochi and Machinga district. Muslims comprised 72.6% of the population in Mangochi district and 66.9% of the population in Machinga.

Notable Muslims
An important Malawian Muslim is Bakili Muluzi, the first (and only) freely elected President of Malawi from 1994 to 2004. Another important Malawian Muslim was the late Sidik Mia, who was a minister in the Tonse Alliance elected in the 2020 Malawi tripatite Elections and died in 2021.

Cassim Chilumpha is a prominent politician that has served as Vice-President of Malawi. Atupele Muluzi, son of Bakili Muluzi, is also a notable politician who is Muslim.

See also
Islam in Africa
Demographics of Malawi

References

Further reading